The 1991 Rothmans Grand Prix was a professional snooker tournament and the second of ten WPBSA ranking events in the 1991/1992 season, following the Dubai Classic and preceding the UK Championship. It was held from 14 to 27 October 1991 at the Hexagon Theatre in Reading, England.

Stephen Hendry successfully defended the title by defeating Steve Davis 10–6 in the final. This was Hendry's third Grand Prix and his 12th ranking title overall.

Tournament summary 
Defending champion Stephen Hendry was the number 1 seed with World Champion John Parrott seeded 2. The remaining places were allocated to players based on the world rankings.

Main draw

Final

Century breaks

 136  Ken Owers
 131, 100  Drew Henry
 131  Steve Davis
 129  Lee Grant
 128, 106  Bjorn L'Orange
 125  Craig MacGillivray
 121  Jason Ferguson
 119, 101, 101  Stephen Hendry
 118  Alex Borg
 114  John Timson
 113  Chris Palmer
 112, 106  Peter Ebdon
 111  Ken Doherty
 111  Nick Walker
 110  Amrik Cheema

 109  Mark Flowerdew
 108  Nick Fruin
 108  James Wattana
 106  Terry Murphy
 105  Barry Bunn
 105  Dene O'Kane
 105  Dean Venables
 103  David Finbow
 102  Colin Morton
 101  Fergal O'Brien
 100  Peter Lines
 100  Anthony O'Connor
 100  Jimmy White
 100  Gary Wilkinson

References

1991
Grand Prix
Grand Prix (snooker)
Grand Prix (snooker)